The 2005–06 season saw St Mirren compete in the Scottish First Division where they finished in 1st position with 76 points, gaining automatic promotion to the Scottish Premier League. St. Mirren reached the 2005 Scottish Challenge Cup Final where they beat Hamilton Academical 2–1.

Final league table

Results
St. Mirren's score comes first

Legend

Scottish First Division

Scottish Cup

Scottish League Cup

Scottish Challenge Cup

Squad statistics

See also
List of St Mirren F.C. seasons

References

External links
 St. Mirren 2005–06 at Soccerbase.com (select relevant season from dropdown list)

St Mirren F.C. seasons
St Mirren